Destiney Toussaint (born 5 December 1988) is an English professional footballer who plays as a midfielder for Wolverhampton Wanderers in the FA Women's National League North.

Club career

London Bees 
In June 2019 London Bees made Toussaint a free agent by email, after refusing to pay for her treatment for an anterior cruciate ligament injury sustained in a match against Aston Villa on 20 April 2019.

Birmingham City W.F.C. 
On 6 September 2020, Toussaint joined Birmingham City.

Coventry United 
Toussaint was playing for Coventry in 2021.

References 

Birmingham City W.F.C. players
Living people
Women's association football midfielders
1988 births
Place of birth missing (living people)
Aston Villa W.F.C. players
Coventry United W.F.C. players
Oxford United W.F.C. players
London Bees players
Women's Championship (England) players
FA Women's National League players
Women's Super League players
English women's footballers